A blue nevus is a type of coloured mole, typically a  single well-defined blue-black bump. 

The blue colour is caused by the pigment being deep in the skin.

Diagnosis is by visualisation and dermoscopy. A biopsy is sometimes performed, or the whole lesion surgically removed. The outcome is generally good but there is a small chance of cancerous transformation. Differential diagnosis includes dermatofibroma and melanoma.

Blue nevi are more common in females than males. It was first studied in 1906 by Tièche, a student of Josef Jadassohn.

Classification
Blue nevi may be divided into the following types:

 A patch blue nevus (also known as an "acquired dermal melanocytosis", and "dermal melanocyte hamartoma") is a cutaneous condition characterized by a diffusely gray-blue area that may have superimposed darker macules.
 A blue nevus of Jadassohn–Tièche (also known as a "common blue nevus", and "nevus ceruleus") is a cutaneous condition characterized by a steel-blue papule or nodule.
 A cellular blue nevus is a cutaneous condition characterized by large, firm, blue or blue-black nodules.
 An epithelioid blue nevus is a cutaneous condition most commonly seen in patients with the Carney complex.
 A deep penetrating nevus is a type of benign melanocytic skin tumor characterized, as its name suggests, by penetration into the deep dermis and/or subcutis.  Smudged chromatic is a typical finding.  In some cases mitotic figures or atypical melanocytic cytology are seen, potentially mimicking a malignant melanoma.  Evaluation by an expert skin pathologist is advisable in some cases to help differentiate from invasive melanoma.
 An amelanotic blue nevus (also known as a "hypomelanotic blue nevus") is a cutaneous condition characterized by mild atypia and pleomorphism.
 A malignant blue nevus is a cutaneous condition characterized by a sheet-like growth pattern, mitoses, necrosis, and cellular atypia.

See also 
 List of cutaneous conditions
 List of genes mutated in pigmented cutaneous lesions

References

External links 

Melanocytic nevi and neoplasms